American-born Chinese (sometimes abbreviated as ABC) is a term widely used to refer to Chinese people that were born in the United States and received U.S. citizenship due to birthright citizenship in the United States.

Contested usage 
In comparison to the term Chinese American, American-born Chinese may not always denote U.S. citizenship, (mainland) Chinese nationals that were born in the United States often renounce their U.S. citizenship due to China prohibiting its citizens from holding multiple citizenships. According to some, the term has perpetual foreigner connotations. It has been noted that the term differs from existing patterns of immigrant designation in American English. For example, Peter Thiel is considered a "German-born American," and Elon Musk is considered a "South African-born American." In both of these cases, the first demographic word refers to the person's citizenship at birth, and the second refers to his citizenship at present. However, in the case of "American-born Chinese," the first demographic word refers to the subject's citizenship at birth (or at present) and the second word to ethnicity.

It has also been observed that, in practice, the term American-born Chinese includes hundreds of thousands of Americans of Chinese descent who were, technically speaking, not born in America, but rather, were brought over by their parents at a young age. This indicates that the term may be a misnomer.

Demographics 

In differing degrees, many ABCs draw together Chinese family culture with American societal culture, developing a transnational life and identity. However, this begins to shift in subsequent generations as families structures change through interracial marriage. In 2000, approximately 45% of American-born Chinese marry non-Chinese Americans; this is contrasted with Chinese Americans more generally, whereby 81.5% of men and 77.9% of women married other Chinese Americans.

In popular culture 
The term was used in the 2006 graphic novel by Gene Luen Yang, entitled American Born Chinese. The book was adapted into the upcoming series of the same name for Disney+.

See also

 Natural-born-citizen clause
 Demographics of the United States
 List of Chinese Americans
 Jook-sing (竹升) is a Cantonese term for an overseas Chinese person who was born in a Western environment and/or a Chinese person who more readily or strongly identifies with Western culture than traditional Chinese culture.
 American-Born Confused Desi (ABCD)

References

Asian-American issues

Chinese American